Redneck Nation: How the South Really Won the War is a book by conservative personality Michael Graham.  Released in 2002 by Warner Books, the book covers a wide variety of Graham's personal opinions on current and historical events in the context of southern ideas and a "redneck" political point of view.

His views on race and social politics within this framework have become a source of contention amongst supporters and critics alike.  His invoking of H. L. Mencken in a quote to begin each chapter is often discussed due to Mencken's sometimes-controversial writings on race and elitism.  However, National Review online (where Graham is a frequent contributor), in their review of the book, noted that Graham's "Menckenesque scorn for boobery happily knows no geographical bounds,".

References

2002 non-fiction books
Books about politics of the United States
Warner Books books